The Estádio do Restelo is a multi-purpose stadium in Lisbon, Portugal. The stadium has a capacity of 19,856 people and was built in 1956, in an old stone quarry. It is situated behind the Jerónimos Monastery in the Lisbon parish of Belém.

It is currently used mostly for football matches, by first division club Clube de Futebol Os Belenenses, but also stages musical performances. The Pope John Paul II has also celebrated a mass there attended by more than 100,000 people.

The inauguration game was against Sporting CP, and Belenenses won by 2–1. The first international match was against Stade de Reims, 2-0 for Belenenses. Finally, the first game counting for the Portuguese First Division was a Belenenses 5-1 Vitória de Setúbal.

As a music venue
On July of 1996, AC/DC performed at the stadium during their Ballbreaker Tour.
On 23 May 2000, American hard rock band Pearl Jam recorded a live album at the stadium.

On 4 October The Smashing Pumpkins played in the stadium during the Sacred and Profane Tour, their last one before the band's breakup latter that year.

Queen + Paul Rodgers performed at the stadium during their tour on 2 July 2005, being the first Queen show in Portugal and the first stadium show in 19 years for the band.

On 18 July 2009 The Killers, Duffy, Mando Diao, Brandi Carlile, The Walkmen and Bettershell made the lineup for the Lisbon's 15th edition of Super Bock Super Rock festival, held at the stadium.

On 1 May 2019, Metallica performed at the stadium during their WorldWired Tour.

Other performances: The Police, Xutos & Pontapés, James, Pearl Jam, Radiohead and Slipknot.

UEFA Women's Champions League Final
The stadium hosted the 2014 UEFA Women's Champions League Final. 
Also in 2019, a solidarity game was played there between the women's team of Benfica and Sporting CP, organised by the Federação Portuguesa de Futebol and Belenenses, with the revenues reverting to Mozambique, after Cyclone Idai. The game established the new record of a women's match in Portugal, having an attendance of 15 000 people.

Curiosity
In 2011, the Portuguese soap opera, "Sedução" produced by TVI told the history of a fictional player of Belenenses and recorded some episodes at the stadium, including during game days.

International matches by the Portugal National Football Team

Also, in 2004, the stadium was chosen by the Italy national football team as their headquarters to the UEFA European Championship.

In 2016, the Portugal national football team did its preparation prior to the UEFA European Championship at Restelo too.

References

Multi-purpose stadiums in Portugal
Sports venues in Lisbon
Restelo
Belém (Lisbon)
C.F. Os Belenenses
Sports venues completed in 1956